Hélder Silva Santos (born October 21, 1988 in Três Corações, Minas Gerais) is a Brazilian footballer who plays as a left back for Criciúma.

Career 

Hélder Santos began his career playing at Londrina youth ranks and managed to impress the Grêmio scouts after play against the club in Copa São Paulo de Futebol Júnior.  In 2007, he joined Grêmio youth side and was promoted to the first squad in 2008.  After the promotion he signed a long-term deal until 2011.

His first team debut occurred on May 10, 2008 in a Grêmio's 1-0 away win against São Paulo.

External links
 Profile at Globo Esporte's Futpedia
 

1988 births
Living people
Brazilian footballers
Grêmio Foot-Ball Porto Alegrense players
Esporte Clube Bahia players
Sertãozinho Futebol Clube players
Figueirense FC players
Londrina Esporte Clube players
Ceará Sporting Club players
Red Bull Brasil players
Maringá Futebol Clube players
Associação Atlética Aparecidense players
Vila Nova Futebol Clube players
Campeonato Brasileiro Série A players
Campeonato Brasileiro Série B players
Campeonato Brasileiro Série D players
Association football midfielders